Turaki A is a ward among the wards in Taraba state capital, Jalingo Local Government Area, Nigeria.

References 

Local Government Areas in Taraba State